The Maphrian, originally known as the Grand Metropolitan of the East and also known as the Catholicos, was the head of the Maphrianate of the East and was the second highest-ranking prelate within the Syriac Orthodox Church, after the Patriarch of Antioch. The maphrianate originated in the formation of a distinct miaphysite ecclesiastical organisation in the Sasanian Empire after the ordination of Ahudemmeh as Grand Metropolitan of the East by Jacob Baradaeus in 559. However, it claimed to be the legitimate continuation of the Church of the East and counted patriarchs prior to the church's adoption of dyophysitism as its own.

Eventually, the Maphrianate of the East was abolished in 1860. A maphrianate in India was established in 1912, thereby creating the Malankara Orthodox Syrian Church, but was not recognised by the Syriac Orthodox Church until 1958. In 1975, Patriarch Ignatius Jacob III withdrew recognition of the maphrian Baselios Augen I, and appointed Baselios Paulose II as his successor. The Malankara Orthodox Syrian Church thus split from the Jacobite Syrian Christian Church, which remained part of the Syriac Orthodox Church.

List of maphrians

Grand Metropolitans of the East before 559

Grand Metropolitans of the East from 559 to 1075
Unless otherwise stated, all information is from the list provided in The Syriac World, as noted in the bibliography below. According to church tradition, numeration includes incumbents deemed legitimate by the Syriac Orthodox Church prior to 559.
Ahudemmeh  (559–575)
vacant (575–578)
Qamishoʿ (578–609)
vacant (609–614)
Samuel (614–624)
vacant (624–628/629)
Marutha of Tikrit (628/629–649)
Denha I (649–659)
vacant (659–669)
Barishoʿ (669–683)
Abraham I (c. 684)
David (c. 684–c. 686)
John I Saba (686–688)
Denha II (688–727)
Paul I (728–757)
John II Kionoyo (759–785)
Joseph I (785–c. 790)
vacant (c. 790–793)
Sharbil (793–ca. 800)
Simon (c. 800–c. 815)
Basil I (c. 815–829)
Daniel (829–834)
Thomas (834–847)
Basil II Lazarus I (848–858)
Melchisedec (858–868)
vacant (869–872)
Sergius (872–883)
vacant (883–887)
Athanasius I (887–903)
vacant (904–c. 910)
Thomas (910–911)
Denha III (913–933)
vacant (933–937)
Basil III (937–961)
Cyriacus (962–980)
John III (981–988)
vacant (988–991)
Ignatius I bar Qiqi (991–1016)
vacant (1016–1027)
Athanasius II (1027–1041)
vacant (1041–1046)
Basil IV (1046–1069)
vacant (1069–1075)

Maphrians of the East from 1075 to 1859
John IV Saliba (1075–1106)
vacant (1106–1112)
Dionysius I Moses (1112–1142)
Ignatius II Lazarus II (1142–1164)
John V Sarugoyo (1164–1188)
Gregory I Jacob (1189–1214)
Dionysius bar Masih (1189–1190)
Ignatius III David (1215–1222)
Dionysius II Saliba I (1222–1231)
John VI bar Maʿdani (1232–1252)
Ignatius IV Saliba (1253–1258)
vacant (1258–1263)
Gregory II bar Hebraeus (1264–1286)
vacant (1286–1288)
Gregory III Barsawmo (1288–1308)
vacant (1308–1317)
Gregory IV Matthew (1317–1345)
vacant (1345–1360)
Gregory V Dioscorus (1360–1361)
vacant (1361–1364)
Athanasius III Abraham (1364–1379)
vacant (1379–1404)
Basil Behnam I (1404–1412)
vacant (1412–1415)
Dioscorus II Behnam (1415–1417)
vacant (1417–1422)
Basil Barsawmo II (1422–1455)
vacant (1455–1458)
Cyril Joseph II (1458–c. 1470)
Basil ʿAziz (1471–1487)
vacant (1487–1490)
Basil Noah (1490–1494)
vacant (1494–1496)
Basil Abraham III (1496–1507)
vacant (1507–1509)
Basil Solomon (1509–1518)
Basil Athanasius Habib (1518–1533)
Basil Elias I (1533–c. 1554)
Basil Ni'matallah (1555–1557)
Basil ʿAbd al-Ghani I al-Mansuri (1557–1575)
Basil Pilate (1575–1591)
Elias II (c. 1590)
Basil ʿAbd al-Ghani II (1591–1597)
Basil Peter Hadaya (1597–1598)
vacant (c. 1598–c. 1624)
Basil Isaiah (c. 1624–1635/c. 1646)
Basil Simon (1635–1639)
Basil Shukrallah (1639–1652)
Basil Behnam III (1653–1655)
Basil Abdulmasih (1655–c. 1658)
Basil Habib (c. 1658–c. 1671)
Basil Yeldo (c. 1671–1683)
Basil George (1683–1686)
Basil Isaac (1687–1709)
Basil Lazarus III (1709–1713)
Basil Matthew II (1713–1727)
Basil Simon (c. 1727–c. 1729)
Basil Lazarus IV (1730–1759)
Basil Shukrallah (1748–1764)
Basil George (1760–1768)
vacant (1768–1783)
Basil Sliba (1783–1790)
Basil Bishara (1790–1817)
Basil Yunan (c. 1803–c. 1809)
Basil Cyril (c. 1803–c. 1811)
Basil ʿAbd al-ʿAziz (c. 1803)
Basil Matthew (1820–c. 1825)
Basil Elias III Karmeh (1825–1827)
Basil Elias IV ʿAnkaz (1827–1839)
Basil Behnam IV (1839–1859)

Maphrians of Tur Abdin from c. 1479 to 1844
Basil (c. 1479)
vacant (c. 1479–1495)
Basil Malke (1495–1510)
vacant (1510–1537)
Basil Abraham (1537–1543)
vacant (1543–1555)
Basil Simon I (1549–1555)
vacant (1555–1561)
Basil Behnam (1561–1562)
vacant (1562–1650)
Basil Habib Haddad (1650–1674)
vacant (1674–c. 1688)
Basil Lazarus (c. 1688–c. 1701)
vacant (c. 1701–1710)
Basil Simon II (1710–1740)
Basil Denha Baltaji (1740–1779)
Basil ʿAbdallah Yahya (1779–1784)
Simon (1786)
Sliba al-ʿAttar (1779–1815)
Basil Barsawmo (1815–1830)
Basil ʿAbd al-Ahad Kindo (1821–1844)

Catholicoi of India from 1964 to present

Baselios Augen I (1964–1975)
Baselios Paulose II (1975–1996)
vacant (1996–2002)
Baselios Thomas I (2002–present)

See also
List of Syriac Orthodox patriarchs of Antioch
List of Syriac Catholic patriarchs of Antioch

References
Notes

Citations

Bibliography

 
Iraq religion-related lists
Lists of Oriental Orthodox Christians
Lists of Catholicoi
Iran religion-related lists
India religion-related lists
Turkey religion-related lists
Afghanistan religion-related lists